This is a list of WebExtensions that are recommended by Mozilla.

Mozilla software

Firefox

Firefox compatibility

Thunderbird

Notes

References

External links
 Official add-ons site for Mozilla products

Mozilla